Stigmaulax cayennensis is a species of predatory sea snail, a marine gastropod mollusk in the family Naticidae, the moon snails.

Distribution

Description 
The maximum recorded shell length is 35 mm.

Habitat 
Minimum recorded depth is 0 m. Maximum recorded depth is 80 m.

References

Naticidae
Gastropods described in 1850